1990 Indian Ocean Games in Madagascar

Played in Madagascar.

Group stage

Group A

21 August 1990

23 August 1990

25 August 1990

Group B

Knockout stage

Semifinals
27 August 1990

Third place match
29 August 1990

Final
30 August 1990

See also
 Indian Ocean Island Games
 Football at the Indian Ocean Island Games

References
 rsssf.com 

1990
Indian Ocean Games 1990